Bhabbouch is a Maronite Christian and Shia Muslim village in the Koura District of Lebanon.

References  

Populated places in the North Governorate
Koura District
Maronite Christian communities in Lebanon
Shia Muslim communities in Lebanon